Hernandia moerenhoutiana (also known as Mountain Lantern-tree, Jack-in-the-box, Tūrina, Puka Tūrina (Cook Islands Māori), Pipi (Samoan) or Pipi Tui (Tongan)) is a species of flowering plant in the family Hernandiaceae. It is widespread in the Pacific islands from Manus Island to the Society Islands, including the Solomon Islands and Cook Islands. It grows on mountainous and makatea (fossilised coral) terrain.

References

Flora of the Cook Islands
Flora of the Solomon Islands (archipelago)
Flora of French Polynesia
Flora of Papua New Guinea
Plants described in 1837
Hernandiaceae